Hargreaves Lansdown plc is a British financial service company based in Bristol, England. It sells funds and shares and related products to retail investors in the United Kingdom. The company is listed on the London Stock Exchange and is a constituent of the FTSE 100 Index.

History
The company was founded on 1 July 1981 by Peter Hargreaves and Stephen Lansdown who had initially traded from a bedroom. Hargreaves Lansdown initially provided information to clients on unit trusts and tax planning matters. Now, the company has grown to be one of the largest in Bristol, located at One College Square, Harbourside.

The company was first listed on the London Stock Exchange in May 2007, with the company's two founders then holding combined stakes equivalent to 80% in the business. In April 2009, Lansdown sold a stake of 4.7% for a sum of £47.2million to put towards the cost of building Bristol City FC's new football stadium, reducing his stake to 22.9%.

In 2019 Hargreaves Lansdown suffered reputational damage when trading was suspended on 4 June 2019 in the Woodford Investment Management fund, which Hargreaves Lansdown had been promoting through its Wealth 50 list despite concerns about the fund's investment strategy and underperformance. On 5 October 2019, retired founder Peter Hargreaves, still the owner of 32% of Hargreaves Lansdown, was reported to say:

Operations
The HL platform enables investors to hold different types of investments together in one place with one valuation and dealing service. Available products include ISA, SIPP, and a Fund & Share dealing account. The company also operates multi-manager unit trusts each of which in turn own a share in a number of underlying funds, as well as its own internally managed equity funds under the HL Select brand. The group also provides financial advisory, stockbroking and annuity broking services to private investors and advice to companies on group pension schemes. The company also offers a Currency Service enabling investors to access exchange rates and send money abroad.

In the first quarter of 2018 Hargreaves Lansdown net revenue rose by 16% and assets under administration rose 3% over the previous quarter, despite the uncertain market environment.

Hargreaves Lansdown is UK's largest direct to investor investment platform. In winter 2018 it administered £91.6 billion of investments for over 1,090,000 clients.

References

External links
Official website

Companies based in Bristol
Financial services companies of the United Kingdom
Financial services companies established in 1981
Companies listed on the London Stock Exchange
Investment management companies of the United Kingdom
2007 initial public offerings
Online brokerages